Edward Richardson (8 December 1929 – 29 July 2009) was an Australian cricketer. He played six first-class matches for Tasmania between 1958 and 1964.

See also
 List of Tasmanian representative cricketers

References

External links
 

1929 births
2009 deaths
Australian cricketers
Tasmania cricketers
Cricketers from Hobart